Kattakampal  is a village in Thrissur district in the state of Kerala, India.

Demographics
 India census, Kattakampal had a population of 11642 with 5509 males and 6133 females.

References

Villages in Thrissur district